Dendropsophus rossalleni is a species of frog in the family Hylidae.
It is found in Brazil, Colombia, Ecuador, Peru, and possibly Bolivia.
Its natural habitats are subtropical or tropical moist lowland forests and intermittent freshwater marshes.

References

rossalleni
Amphibians of Brazil
Amphibians of Colombia
Amphibians of Ecuador
Amphibians of Peru
Amphibians described in 1959
Taxonomy articles created by Polbot